Javad Owji (born 24 July 1966) is an Iranian oil engineer and politician who has been serving as the minister of oil since 25 August 2021.

Early life and education
Owji was born in Mashhad in 1966. He received a bachelor's degree in oil engineering from Petroleum University of Technology in Ahwaz.

Career
From 1980 Owji worked in the oil-related public offices. He was the deputy oil minister and the head of the National Iranian Gas Company from 2009 to 2013 during the last term of President Mahmoud Ahmadinejad. He also served in various oil-related posts, including chairman of the board of supervision of production and gas refineries and vice chairman of Petro Mofid Oil and Gas Development Holding. Owji was nominated by President Ebrahim Raisi as oil minister on 11 August 2021. On 25 August Owji was confirmed by the Majlis with 198 to 70 with 18 abstentions. He succeeded Bijan Namdar Zangeneh in the post.

References

External links

20th-century Iranian engineers
21st-century Iranian engineers
21st-century Iranian politicians
1966 births
Directors of the National Iranian Oil Company
Living people
Oil ministers of Iran
People from Mashhad
Petroleum University of Technology alumni
Petroleum engineers